The first season of Queer as Folk, an American and Canadian television series, consisted of twenty-two episodes and premiered on Showtime on December 3, 2000, in the United States and on Showcase on January 22, 2001, in Canada.

Cast

Main cast
 Gale Harold as Brian Kinney
 Randy Harrison as Justin Taylor
 Hal Sparks as Michael Novotny
 Peter Paige as Emmett Honeycutt
 Scott Lowell as Ted Schmidt
 Thea Gill as Lindsay Peterson
 Michelle Clunie as Melanie Marcus
 Sharon Gless as Debbie Novotny
 Jack Wetherall as Vic Grassi

Supporting cast
 Chris Potter as Dr. David Cameron
 Sherry Miller as Jennifer Taylor
 Makyla Smith as Daphne Chanders
 Dean Armstrong as Blake Wyzecki
Lindsey Connell as Tracey
 Stephanie Moore as Cynthia

Episodes

 In the United States, the first episode aired #1 and #2 back-to-back. In Canada, the first episode consisted of #1-#3.

References

2000 American television seasons
2000 Canadian television seasons
2001 American television seasons
2001 Canadian television seasons
Queer as Folk